Nasir Ali (born 1 January 1959 in Sialkot) is a Pakistani field hockey player. He played at fullback position. He was a player in the National hockey team from 1981 to 1988 where he played 150 matches for his country and scored 19 goals . He was also the former captain of Pakistan national hockey team .

He was captain of the Pakistan Hockey Team which finished 5th in the 1988 Olympics in Seoul, after being a member of the Gold Medal-winning team at the 1984 Olympics in Los Angeles. He was capped 150 times and scored 19 goals.

References

External links
 
 

1959 births
Pakistani male field hockey players
Olympic field hockey players of Pakistan
Field hockey players at the 1984 Summer Olympics
Field hockey players at the 1988 Summer Olympics
Living people
Field hockey players from Sialkot
Olympic medalists in field hockey
Recipients of the Pride of Performance
Medalists at the 1984 Summer Olympics
Asian Games gold medalists for Pakistan
Asian Games silver medalists for Pakistan
Olympic gold medalists for Pakistan
Field hockey players at the 1982 Asian Games
Field hockey players at the 1986 Asian Games
Medalists at the 1982 Asian Games
Medalists at the 1986 Asian Games
Asian Games medalists in field hockey